Patikul, officially the Municipality of Patikul (Tausūg: Kawman sin Patikul), is a 3rd class municipality in the province of Sulu, Philippines. According to the 2020 census, it has a population of 79,564 people.

The municipality is known for being a stronghold of the Abu Sayyaf insurgent group.

History
On October 10, 1977, thirty-five officers and men of the Philippine Army were killed by insurgents of the Moro National Liberation Front under Usman Sali.

On 2 February 2019, five soldiers were killed and five others injured in a shootout with the ISIL-linked group, Abu Sayyaf, in Patikul. Three terrorists were killed and 15 others were injured. The attack happened a week after a bombing that killed 20 people in a cathedral in the neighboring city of Jolo.

On June 4, 2021, A Lockheed C-130 Hercules aircraft of the Philippine Air Force (PAF) crashed in Patikul, Sulu, killing 53 people. The incident is the deadliest aviation accident involving the Philippine military.

Geography

Barangays
Patikul is politically subdivided into 30 barangays.

Climate

Demographics

Economy

References

External links
Patikul Profile at PhilAtlas.com
[ Philippine Standard Geographic Code]
  Patikul Profile at the DTI Cities and Municipalities Competitive Index
Philippine Census Information
Local Governance Performance Management System

Municipalities of Sulu